William Goc-ong (born December 8, 1993), professionally known as Yamyam Gucong, is a Filipino comedian and actor known for winning the Philippine reality television series, Pinoy Big Brother: Otso.

Early life 
Yamyam was born on December 8, 1993 in Brgy. Anonang in the town of Inabanga, Bohol, Philippines. Before winning Pinoy Big Brother: Otso, he stopped pursuing education at fifth grade in order to sustain his family's financial needs. He worked several jobs in Cebu such as a water-delivery man and as a house help. On August 12, 2018, Gucong auditioned as an adult housemate in the reality show Pinoy Big Brother: Otso. He later landed a spot as a housemate on January 8, 2019 and eventually became the show's big winner.

Career
After their temporary exit, Yamyam appeared on several mall shows, and guested several ABS-CBN shows. He was also cast in a supporting role in the Filipino sit-com Home Sweetie Home. In May 2019, Gucong appeared on the Pinoy Big Brother: Otso album entitled "Ang Soundtrack ng Bahay Mo" on the track "Ikaw Ang Pinili ng Puso Ko" alongside his fellow batchmate, Fumiya Sankai.

After PBB, Yamyam appeared in several TV Shows of ABS-CBN, including his first dramatic acting stint in Maalaala Mo Kaya, episode entitled "Bukid", which showed his life story prior to his PBB stint. He starred alongside veteran actors, Lito Pimentel and Glenda Garcia; and ex-PBB housemates Yong Muhajil, Banjo Dangalan and Wealand Ferrer. The episode received a good feedback from viewers, and trended in the Philippines and Worldwide.

In 2020, he hosted an online digital show, "Tipid Nation", which was aired on ABS-CBN YouTube channel and ABS-CBN Facebook Page produced by TVDG. This digital show gives advices on how we can save money on such situations, such as buying new clothes for Job Interviews and Street food Hacks.

He was also hosting a travel digital show in TFC Online, entitled "Highway Harvest", along with his friend and ex-PBB housemate, Fumiya Sankai. This show premiered on April 9, 2020 and is one of the most viewed shows in TFC Online.

He is also included in an Online show entitled "Usapang Lalaki" every 12nn in Star Hunt Kumu account. This is together with Argel Saycon and discusses various topics related to men.

He was also cast in 2020 MMFF entry, "Mang Kepweng: Ang Lihim ng Bandanang Itim". This is also his first movie in his entire showbiz career.

He is also cast in the IWantTFC Series "Hoy, Love You!" together with Joross Gamboa and Roxanne Guinoo, and ex-PBB OTSO housemates Karina Bautista and Aljon Mendoza.

Personal life
After PBB, he got his condominium unit prize, which is sponsored by Suntrust.

He also built his own bakeshop business named "Yamito's Bakeshop". He used his prize money to invest in it. The first branch of the bakeshop, which is located in his hometown in Inabanga opened on December 8, 2019, which coincided on his 26th birthday. After few months, he opened another branch in Ubay, Bohol last March 8, 2020.

Gucong had been in a relationship with Elaine Toradio, his non-showbiz girlfriend, where he proposed to her in October 2021. It was revealed in December 2021 that he was to have a child with Toradio, to which they welcomed a baby daughter on February 21, 2022.

Filmography

Television

Digital

Film

Discography

Singles

Concerts and Tours
 FumiYam in Singapore (October 20, 2019)
 Fumiya Amazing ‘Di Ba? (as guest with Lou Yanong and Andre Brouillette) (November 15, 2019)
 A Beautiful LAYF in Baliwag (November 24, 2019)

Awards and Nomination

References

External links
 
 

1993 births
Filipino male film actors
Filipino male comedians
ABS-CBN personalities
Pinoy Big Brother contestants
People from Bohol
Living people
Big Brother (franchise) winners
Filipino male television actors
21st-century Filipino male singers